Curtis Melvin Hollis (born April 25, 1998) is an American professional basketball player who last played for the Santa Cruz Warriors of the NBA G League and Dragons Rhöndorf of the ProB. He played one season for Hutchinson Community College. In 2018, he played for the Houston Ballers of the Junior Basketball Association (JBA).

High school career 
Hollis attended Mansfield Summit High School for three seasons and was named All-District as a junior. In his senior season, he transferred to Advanced Prep International and won the state championship. At API, Hollis played alongside Terrance Ferguson and Billy Preston, but was still invited to the Pangos All-American Camp in 2016. Hollis played on a team with Trae Young at the U16 level in his first year on Nike’s EYBL circuit. He also played with future #1 pick Deandre Ayton around that time as well. Hollis scored 27 points in the semifinal of the 2016 Neosho Holiday Classic. He competed in AAU play for NIKE Proskills, Houston Hoops, and YGC36.

In his senior year, Hollis made the school football team and played seven games at wide receiver. He had 12 receptions for 222 yards and was listed as a three-star prospect by 247sports.com. Hollis was also named MVP at the Dallas Cowboys U Camp, and was spoken of highly by Jason Garrett, the Cowboys' head coach.  He drew football scholarship offers from Kansas and Oklahoma State. Ultimately, Hollis committed to North Texas, but never played for them in order to focus on basketball.

College career
After high school, Hollis attended Hutchinson Community College in Hutchinson, Kansas. The college was one of the better National Junior College Athletic Association (NJCAA) programs and produced NBA player Kadeem Allen. As a freshman, Hollis averaged 6.9 points, 3.3 rebounds and 1.4 assists per game, shooting 50 percent from the field. His best game was a 19-point performance against Garden City Community College on February 7, 2018. Hutchinson's season ended when they fell to Florida SouthWestern in the NJCAA tournament, ending their quest for back-to-back titles. After one season, Hollis decided to go professional.

Professional career

Houston Ballers
In April 2018, Hollis joined the Houston Ballers of the Junior Basketball Association (JBA). He was persuaded to join the nascent league after talking to founder LaVar Ball and being informed that the top 10 players would compete against European talent. “It’s been amazing, honestly. The competition out here is crazy. A lot of people are out here trying to chase their dream," said Hollis. Hollis stated that the idea of the JBA resonated with him, and he was named the best player on the team by the Chicago Sun-Times. In his debut on June 23, 2018, Hollis was close to recording a triple-double with 24 points, 13 rebounds, and a team-high 8 assists in a blowout 116–91 win over the New York Ballers. Three days later, he recorded a new season-high 31 points and 13 rebounds in a 125–117 overtime loss over the Chicago Ballers. In the third game against Dallas on June 28, Hollis led all scorers with 34 points to go with 7 rebounds and 6 assists to ensure a close 105-102 victory. During his next game, on July 3, Hollis was on the precipice of his first triple-double yet again, recording 29 points, a new season-high 16 rebounds, and a career-high 9 assists in a 115–109 loss to the Atlanta Ballers. On July 17, Hollis recorded a career-high 37 points and 16 rebounds in a 111–103 win over the Philadelphia Ballers. On July 26, Hollis topped his previous scoring high with 40 points, 11 rebounds, and 9 assists in a 169–153 loss to the Los Angeles Ballers. He was later named to the West roster for the JBA All-Star Game. Hollis averaged 29.3 points, 11.3 rebounds, and 5.3 assists per game for Houston. After the conclusion of the inaugural JBA season, Hollis was named one of 14 players included for the JBA USA Team for their 2018 international tour.

Dragons Rhöndorf

In July 2019, Hollis signed with the Dragons Rhöndorf of the German ProB league. Head coach of the Dragons Yassin Idhibi became aware of Hollis through the JBA European tour. He had 26 points and 11 rebounds in a win against the  New Elephants Grevenbroich. Hollis scored 28 points in an upset of the Rheinstars Cologne. Hollis posted 40 points against Baunach Young Pikes, and scored 20 or more points in 13 games. He averaged 22.7 points, 8.2 rebounds, 3.6 assists and 3.0 steals per game in 18 games. Hollis left the team in January 2020.

Santa Cruz Warriors

In October 2021, Hollis joined the Santa Cruz Warriors of the NBA G League after a successful tryout. However, he was waived on November 4.

References 

1998 births
Living people
African-American basketball players
American expatriate basketball people in Germany
Basketball players from Dallas
Hutchinson Blue Dragons men's basketball players
Junior Basketball Association players
Shooting guards
21st-century African-American sportspeople